Waiwhetū is an eastern suburb of Lower Hutt in the Wellington Region situated in the south of the North Island of New Zealand.

In the 19th-century period of European settlement it was worked by Irish-born Alfred Ludlam, who was a member of three of New Zealand's four earliest parliaments. In the 1840s it was set aside by the New Zealand Company as a  native reserve for the Te Āti Awa tribe. In the 1930s the New Zealand government compulsorily acquired the land and built new homes for Te Āti Awa.

The suburb includes Waiwhetū Marae, a marae (tribal meeting-ground) of Taranaki Whānui ki te Upoko o te Ika and of Te Āti Awa. The marae, founded in 1960, includes the Arohanui ki te Tangata wharenui (meeting house).

Waiwhetū Marae features a number of significant carvings and has associations with a number of notable Māori artists, including Rangi Hetet (who did much of the original carving for the marae), his wife Erenora Puketapu-Hetet and their daughter Veranoa Hetet. The marae is associated with Ihaia Puketapu.

Demographics

Waiwhetū had a population of 4,305 at the 2018 New Zealand census, an increase of 342 people (8.6%) since the 2013 census, and an increase of 354 people (9.0%) since the 2006 census. There were 1,590 households. There were 2,097 males and 2,208 females, giving a sex ratio of 0.95 males per female. The median age was 35.5 years (compared with 37.4 years nationally), with 852 people (19.8%) aged under 15 years, 906 (21.0%) aged 15 to 29, 2,025 (47.0%) aged 30 to 64, and 519 (12.1%) aged 65 or older.

Ethnicities were 58.7% European/Pākehā, 20.4% Māori, 9.7% Pacific peoples, 21.7% Asian, and 4.2% other ethnicities (totals add to more than 100% since people could identify with multiple ethnicities).

The proportion of people born overseas was 29.8%, compared with 27.1% nationally.

Although some people objected to giving their religion, 44.0% had no religion, 37.0% were Christian, 6.6% were Hindu, 2.3% were Muslim, 1.3% were Buddhist and 3.4% had other religions.

Of those at least 15 years old, 945 (27.4%) people had a bachelor or higher degree, and 546 (15.8%) people had no formal qualifications. The median income was $33,600, compared with $31,800 nationally. The employment status of those at least 15 was that 1,779 (51.5%) people were employed full-time, 504 (14.6%) were part-time, and 198 (5.7%) were unemployed.

Education

References

Suburbs of Lower Hutt